Zentrum für Biodokumentation is a museum in Saarland, Germany.

External links
www.saarland.de

Museums in Saarland